Lodge is a surname. Notable people with the surname include:

Alexander Lodge (1881–1938), British engineer
Carron Lodge (c. 1883 – 1910), British figure and landscape painter
David Lodge (author) (born 1935), British author
Sir Edmund Lodge (1756–1839), British Officer of Arms and author
Eleanor Constance Lodge (1869–1936), historian and Principal of Westfield College, London
Francis Graham Lodge (1908–2002), British black-and-white artist
George Cabot Lodge, (1873–1909), American poet
George Edward Lodge (1860–1954), British birds artist
Henry Cabot Lodge (1850–1924), U.S. Senator from Massachusetts
Henry Cabot Lodge, Jr. (1902–1985), U.S. Senator from Massachusetts, grandson of Henry Cabot Lodge
Jimmy Lodge (1895–1971), English professional footballer
John Lodge (musician) (born 1945), English musician, best known as the bassist and singer of The Moody Blues
John C. Lodge (1862–1950), mayor of Detroit, Michigan
Judith Lodge (born 1941), Canadian painter and photographer
Sir Oliver Lodge (1851–1940), British physicist and writer who patented radio frequency tuning
Oliver W. F. Lodge (1878–1955), poet and author
Sir Richard Lodge (1855–1936), historian
Samuel Lodge (1829–1897), clergyman and author
Stephen Lodge (screenwriter) (1943–2017), American screenwriter and actor
Stephen Lodge (referee) (born 1952), retired English football official
Thomas Lodge (c. 1558–1625), dramatist and writer
Tom Lodge (1936–2012), British author and radio broadcaster

Fictional characters:
Hiram Lodge, character from Archie, father of Veronica Lodge
Veronica Lodge, character from Archie, daughter of Hiram Lodge